Mount Pakenham is a ski hill to the south-west of Ottawa, Ontario, Canada, near the town of Pakenham.

See also
 Calabogie Peaks – nearby ski resort
 Camp Fortune
 List of ski areas and resorts in Canada

References

External links
  Mount Pakenham website

Pakenham
Ski areas and resorts in Ontario
Mountains of Canada under 1000 metres